American actress and model Chloë Grace Moretz has won multiple awards and nominations throughout her career. In 2006, she was nominated for "Best Performance in a Feature Film" for the Young Actress Age Ten or Younger category at the Young Artist Awards for her role in The Amityville Horror. She received the same nomination in 2007 for the film Big Momma's House 2 alongside a nomination for Best Performance in a TV Series - Guest Starring Young Actress for her role in Desperate Housewives.

Her 2010 superhero film Kick-Ass won her awards such as Best Breakthrough Performance – Female at the Scream Awards in 2010, Best Breakthrough Performance, Best Hero and Biggest Badass Star at the MTV Movie & TV Awards, and Best Newcomer at the Empire Awards in 2011. In the latter year, she also won seven awards including Best Performance by a Younger Actor (Saturn Award) and Best Horror Actress (Scream Awards) for her film Let Me In, and Best Performance in a Feature Film (Young Artist Award) for the film Diary of a Wimpy Kid.

She has won all but three of her nominated awards from 2012 to 2016. The film Hugo has won her the People's Choice Award Favorite Movie Star Under 25 and Young Artist Award for Best Leading Young Actress in a Feature Film in 2012, while Kick-Ass 2 won her the MTV Movie Award for Biggest Teen Bad Kicking Ass in 2013. She was also named Next Future Icon at the Elle Style Awards. At the Teen Choice Awards, Moretz has won awards for the films If I Stay and Neighbors 2: Sorority Rising in the categories of Drama and Comedy, respectively.

Broadcast Film Critics Association Awards

Elle Style Awards

Empire Awards

MTV Movie & TV Awards

People's Choice Awards

People Magazine Awards

Saturn Awards

Scream Awards

Teen Choice Awards

Women in Film Crystal + Lucy Awards

Young Artist Award

Young Hollywood Awards

References

Lists of awards received by American actor